Zeki Şamiloğlu (born 29 January, 1937) is a Turkish alpine skier. He competed at the 1956, 1960 and 1964 Winter Olympic Games.

References

External links
 

1937 births
Living people
Turkish male alpine skiers
Olympic alpine skiers of Turkey
Alpine skiers at the 1956 Winter Olympics
Alpine skiers at the 1960 Winter Olympics
Alpine skiers at the 1964 Winter Olympics
People from Sarıkamış
20th-century Turkish people